T. M. Thyagarajan (28 May 1923 – 27 June 2007)  fondly known as TMT was a Carnatic vocalist and musicologist from Tamil Nadu in Southern India.  He was awarded the Madras Music Academy's Sangeetha Kalanidhi in 1981.

Family background
He hails from an illustrious family in Thanjavur famous for music and dance. His grandfather and great-grandfather were Asthana Vidwans in the Baroda court. Even now members of this family are living in Vadodara with the family name Thanjavurkar.

Thiagarajan's father is Mahalingam Pillai, a mridangam maestro and his mother is Seethalakshmi Ammal.

Training in music

Thiagarajan started learning music from his father. Later, he became a disciple of Semmangudi Srinivasa Iyer and had advanced training under him. Semmangudi Srinivasa Iyer, speaking on the occasion of T. M. Thiagarajan's 80th birthday, said that it was mridangam maestro Thanjavur Vaidyanatha Iyer who sent Thiagarajan to him as a student.

Music programs
He performed his first stage concert at Thiruvaiyaru when he was only eight years old. A senior artiste Pudukottai Dakshinamurthi Pillai, who accompanied him on mridangam was delighted with the boy's performance. At the end of the concert, Dakshinamurthi Pillai took the boy in his arms and blessed him.

Thiagarajan has performed numerous concerts on All India Radio, various TV channels and on stage. In the early days he was accompanied on the mridangam either by his father or his brother Thambuswamy. Another brother Balasubramanian accompanied on the violin. It was a family team. Both his brothers died in the same month.

As a musicologist
Thiagarajan was not only a singer; he was a lyricist, composer, teacher and administrator.

He was Principal of the Government Music College in Chennai. After retirement from this post in 1981, he served as the Principal of the Music Teachers' college run by the Music Academy, Chennai.

He composed music to rare kritis of lesser known composers like Chengalvaraya Sastri, Ramaswamy Sivan, Annayya, Periyasamy Thooran.

He also composed music to Andal's Tiruppavai, Manaickavasagar's Thiruvembavai and published with notations.

Students 
Rajalakshmi Sekar, Trichy Sisters, Mangalam Shankar, S. Prema and S. Jaya, O. S. Thyagarajan, Sridhar Nilakantan, Gowri Gokul, Lakshmi Rangarajan, Kuzhikkarai Viswalingam, S. Seetharaman, E. Gayatri, M. Narmada, Raji Gopalakrishnan, Nirmala Sunderarajan and Subhashini Parthasarathy are some of the torch bearers of the TMT tradition.

Awards and honours 
 Sangeetha Kalanidhi, 1981 by Music Academy Chennai
 Sangeet Natak Akademi Award, 1982 by Sangeet Natak Academy
 Sangeetha Choodamani, 1974 by Sri Krishna Gana Sabha, Chennai
 New raga Thyagaraja Mangalam created and named after T. M. Thiagarajan by Mahesh Mahadev in 2021

Death
After a prolonged illness T. M. Thiagarajan died on 27 June 2007 in Chennai.

Notes

References

Male Carnatic singers
Carnatic singers
Tamil singers
Sangeetha Kalanidhi recipients
Sangeet Natak Akademi
1923 births
2007 deaths
20th-century Indian male classical singers
Singers from Tamil Nadu
People from Thanjavur
Recipients of the Sangeet Natak Akademi Award